The preliminaries and repechages of the Women's individual kata competition at the 2018 World Karate Championships were held on November 6th, 2018 and the finals on November 10th, 2018.

Results

Finals

Repechage

Pool A
Preliminary round fights

Pool B

Pool C
Preliminary round fights

Pool D

References

External links
Draw

Women's individual kata
2018 in women's karate